Dimethylbutene is an alkene with a molecular formula C6H12. It has the following possible structural isomers:

 2,3-Dimethyl-1-butene
 3,3-Dimethyl-1-butene
 2,3-Dimethyl-2-butene

Alkenes